The Zimbabwe cricket team toured the United Arab Emirates in March 2021 to play two Test and three Twenty20 International (T20I) matches against Afghanistan. It was the first time the two teams had played a Test match against each other. Ahmed Shah Pakteen was named as the on-field umpire for both Tests, becoming the first Afghan umpire to officiate in Test cricket.

Originally the series was scheduled to be played in Oman. In January 2021, the International Cricket Council (ICC) gave accreditation for the Ministry Turf 1 at the Al Amerat Cricket Stadium in Muscat to host Test cricket. However, in February 2021, the Afghanistan Cricket Board (ACB) confirmed that the series would take place in the UAE. The series was initially put into doubt due to the COVID-19 pandemic, however in late January 2021, Zimbabwe's Sports and Recreation Commission gave its approval for the tour to take place. On 12 February 2021, the ACB announced the tour schedule.

Zimbabwe won the first Test inside two days by ten wickets, with captain Sean Williams scoring a century in their first innings. Zimbabwe last won a Test match in November 2018, when they beat Bangladesh. Afghanistan won the second Test match by six wickets to draw the series 1–1, with Hashmatullah Shahidi becoming the first batsman for Afghanistan to score a double century in Test cricket.

Afghanistan won the first two T20I matches, by 48 and 45 runs respectively, to win the series with a game to spare. Afghanistan won the third and final match by 47 runs, with Asghar Afghan becoming the most successful captain in men's T20I cricket.

Squads

Afghanistan also named Zahir Khan and Abdul Wasi as reserve players for the Test matches. Chamu Chibhabha, Zimbabwe's limited overs captain, did not travel for the T20I matches due to an injury. The Afghanistan Cricket Board also confirmed that Mujeeb Ur Rahman, Hamid Hassan, Gulbadin Naib, Waqar Salamkheil, Azmatullah Omarzai could join the T20I squad once their visa issues had been resolved.

Tour match

Test series

1st Test

2nd Test

T20I series

1st T20I

2nd T20I

3rd T20I

Notes

References

External links
 Series home at ESPN Cricinfo

2021 in Afghan cricket
2021 in Zimbabwean cricket
International cricket competitions in 2020–21
Afghan cricket tours abroad
Zimbabwean cricket tours abroad